Thomas Andrew "Drew" Pomeranz (born November 22, 1988), nicknamed Big Smooth, is an American professional baseball pitcher for the San Diego Padres of Major League Baseball (MLB). He previously played for the Colorado Rockies, Oakland Athletics, Boston Red Sox, San Francisco Giants, and Milwaukee Brewers. Pomeranz was an MLB All-Star with the Padres in 2016, and a World Series champion with the Red Sox in 2018.

Early years
Pomeranz is from Collierville, Tennessee. Despite being selected in 12th round of the 2007 Major League Baseball draft by the Texas Rangers, he opted to play college baseball for the University of Mississippi. He also received scholarship offers from Tennessee, Memphis, and Mississippi State and was recruited heavily by LSU and Alabama. Pomeranz pitched the United States Collegiate National Team to a victory in the 2009 World Baseball Challenge, throwing a one-hitter in the championship game against the German national baseball team. He finished the tournament with a 4–1 record and a 1.75 earned run average (ERA), while also leading the team with 48 strikeouts. Pomeranz was the 2010 recipient of the Cellular South Ferriss Trophy (now the C Spire Ferriss Trophy), awarded annually to Mississippi's top collegiate baseball player.

Professional career

Cleveland Indians
Pomeranz was initially drafted by the Texas Rangers in 2007 but decided to go to college instead. He was then drafted by the Cleveland Indians in the first round of the 2010 Major League Baseball draft. He signed with the Indians on August 16, 2010, right before the deadline; his contract, which included a $2.65 million signing bonus, was the largest bonus given to a college pitcher in the draft that year.

He was considered one of the top 50 prospects in baseball in 2011.

Colorado Rockies
On July 31, 2011, Pomeranz, Alex White, Joe Gardner, and Matt McBride were traded to the Colorado Rockies for Ubaldo Jiménez. He made his Major League debut when he started and pitched five scoreless innings to pick up the win against the Cincinnati Reds on September 11, 2011. He made 4 starts in September 2011, finishing 1–2 with a 5.40 ERA.

After employing a 75-pitch limit after the first month of the season, Pomeranz averaged less than 5 innings per start. On May 7, 2012, Pomeranz hit his first career home run. Pomeranz spent the 2012 season between AAA and the Rockies rotation, making 22 starts for them despite recording a 2–9 record. For the 2013 season, Pomeranz began the season in AAA and would only appear in 8 games, 4 starts for the Rockies.

Oakland Athletics

On December 10, 2013, Pomeranz, along with minor league pitcher Chris Jensen, was traded to the Oakland Athletics for pitcher Brett Anderson. Pomeranz began 2014 as a member of the A's bullpen, where he made 9 appearances, going 1–1 with a 1.98 ERA in 13.2 innings, before being moved to the rotation on May 9 to replace the struggling Dan Straily. Pomeranz did not give up a run in the rotation until his fourth start, on May 25, giving Oakland three 5-inning starts of shutout ball before. He made 8 starts, going 4–3 with a 3.21 ERA, striking out 37 in 42 innings, before fracturing his non-throwing hand by punching a wooden chair after giving up 8 runs in 3.2 innings against the Rangers on June 16. Brad Mills took his spot in the rotation as Pomeranz went on the disabled list. He was recalled from the Sacramento River Cats on August 27 for a start against the Houston Astros. He was optioned to the Beloit Snappers the next day. In his first season as an Oakland Athletic, Pomeranz posted a career low 2.35 ERA in 20 games, 10 starts for the A's.

For the 2015 season, Pomeranz was shifted to the bullpen while also starting 9 games for the A's. Despite raising his ERA a full run higher from the previous season, Pomeranz finished appearing in a career-high 53 games, recording 3 saves and logging in 86 innings.

San Diego Padres
On December 2, 2015, the Athletics traded Pomeranz, José Torres, and a player to be named later or cash considerations to the San Diego Padres for Marc Rzepczynski and Yonder Alonso. Pomeranz approached Padres' manager Andy Green about giving him an opportunity to start. Pomeranz made the Padres' starting rotation, and was named to appear in the 2016 MLB All-Star Game after posting a 2.47 ERA and leading the NL with a .184 batting average against in the first half.

Boston Red Sox
During the 2016 MLB All-Star break, the Padres traded Pomeranz to the Boston Red Sox for Anderson Espinoza, a highly regarded minor league pitching prospect. On September 16, 2016, Padres general manager A. J. Preller was suspended for 30 days for keeping two sets of medical records for players—one internal and one for league use. There had been several instances of duplicate records, but the suspension was handed out specifically with respect to the Pomeranz trade.

With the 2016 Red Sox, Pomeranz pitched to a 4.59 ERA and a record of 3–5, recording 71 strikeouts and 24 walks in  innings of work in 14 regular season appearances (13 starts). That season he led all major league pitchers in curveball percentage (39.2%). He also tied for the major league lead in bunt hits allowed, with eight. In the ALDS against the Cleveland Indians, he made two relief appearances, allowing two runs in  innings (4.91 ERA).

For the 2017 Red Sox, Pomeranz had a record of 17–6 with a 3.32 ERA in 32 appearances (all starts), registering 174 strikeouts and 69 walks in  regular season innings. For the second consecutive season he led all major league pitchers in curveball percentage (37.0%). In the postseason, he started Game 2 of the ALDS against the Houston Astros; he only pitched into the third inning while allowing four runs (18.00 ERA) and took the loss.

During the 2018 Red Sox season, Pomeranz made his first start on April 20, after beginning the season on the disabled list due to a flexor strain. Through the end of May, his record was 1–3 with a 6.81 ERA. On June 5, he was placed on the disabled list due to left biceps tendinitis; he was activated on July 24 as a relief pitcher. He remained in the bullpen for the remainder of the season, finishing at 2–6 with a 6.08 ERA in 26 games (11 starts) for Boston. Pomeranz was initially not included on Boston's postseason roster, but was added for the World Series in place of Brandon Workman. Although Pomeranz did not pitch in the World Series, the Red Sox beat the Los Angeles Dodgers in five games, making Pomeranz a World Series champion for the first time in his career.

San Francisco Giants
On January 23, 2019, Pomeranz signed with the San Francisco Giants. His one-year contract is worth $1.5 million and includes an additional $3.5 million attainable through incentives. He was moved to the bullpen on July 20 after he struggled with a 6.10 ERA in 17 starts and a 2–9 record.

Milwaukee Brewers
On July 31, 2019, the Giants traded Pomeranz and Ray Black to the Milwaukee Brewers for Mauricio Dubon.

San Diego Padres (second stint)
On November 27, 2019, Pomeranz signed a four-year contract with the San Diego Padres. Pomeranz began the shortened 2020 season with 18.2 consecutive scoreless innings before giving up a three-run home run to Wilmer Flores of the San Francisco Giants on September 25, in the final series of the season.

In 2021 for the Padres, Pomeranz pitched to a 1.75 ERA with 30 strikeouts in 27 appearances. On August 14, 2021, it was announced that Pomeranz would undergo season-ending surgery to repair a torn flexor tendon.

Pomeranz began the 2022 season in recovery as he was placed on the 60-day injured list on March 28, 2022.

Personal life
Pomeranz married his longtime girlfriend, Carolyn Esserman, on November 19, 2016. His older brother Stu also played in MLB. Drew and Stu are great-grandsons of former professional football and baseball player Garland Buckeye. In August 2020, Pomeranz and his wife announced, via social media, that they were expecting their first child. Their son, Tate Pomeranz, was born on February 6, 2021.

References

Further reading

External links
, or Retrosheet

1988 births
Living people
People from Collierville, Tennessee
Baseball players from Memphis, Tennessee
Major League Baseball pitchers
National League All-Stars
Colorado Rockies players
Oakland Athletics players
San Diego Padres players
Boston Red Sox players
San Francisco Giants players
Milwaukee Brewers players
Ole Miss Rebels baseball players
Kinston Indians players
Akron Aeros players
Tulsa Drillers players
Colorado Springs Sky Sox players
Sacramento River Cats players
All-American college baseball players